Schwartziella floridana is a species of minute sea snail, a marine gastropod mollusk or micromollusk in the family Zebinidae.

Distribution
This species occurs in the Gulf of Mexico.

Description 
The maximum recorded shell length is 4.5 mm.

Habitat 
Minimum recorded depth is 0 m. Maximum recorded depth is 48 m.

References

 Rosenberg, G., F. Moretzsohn, and E. F. García. 2009. Gastropoda (Mollusca) of the Gulf of Mexico, Pp. 579–699 in Felder, D.L. and D.K. Camp (eds.), Gulf of Mexico–Origins, Waters, and Biota. Biodiversity. Texas A&M Press, College Station, Texas.

floridana
Gastropods described in 1953